Titãs Trio Acústico is the sixteenth studio album by Brazilian rock band Titãs Released throughout 2020 by the BMG label, the EPs bring together acoustic versions of a total of 24 songs previously released by the group. Initially divided into three EPs throughout 2020, the disc won a full version on January 29, 2021, also on a physical double CD, bringing together the 24 tracks from the three EPs.

The project was conceived to celebrate the 20th anniversary of their Acústico MTV album, released in 1997; since in 2017 they were focusing on their rock opera Doze Flores Amarelas, the celebration wasn't possible until 2020.

Background

Tour 
In 2017, Titãs' Acústico MTV turned 20 years old since its release and fans were asking the band to celebrate the occasion somehow, but they were focusing on their rock opera Doze Flores Amarelas, which involved a complex and sophisticated tour. Since Brazil's economy wasn't going through a favorable time and fans kept requesting the celebration, the band started in 2019 a series of acoustic performances in which they mixed songs from the 1997 album, more recent works and older songs that hadn't been picked for Unplugged. The tour was named "Trio Acústico" (Acoustic Trio).

The first performance took place in Paulínia on 23 February, and the tour became a priority for the band, which conciliated it with the Doze Flores Amarelas promotional tour and a third tour called "Enquanto Houver Sol", this one in an electric format and involving songs from many eras of the group. The preference for Trio Acústico is due to the simplicity of the performances. Otávio Juliano, who directs the rock opera, is also responsible for this tour.

The tour's idea is to pay tribute to the album without copying it. Each show is divided into three parts: one with all three remaining original members; one in which each of them performs solo, and one with the trio performing with the two session members, Fabre and Lee. Usually, Bellotto sings "Polícia" and "Querem Meu Sangue"; Mello performs "Cabeça Dinossauro", "Tô Cansado" and "Toda Cor" alone on his acoustic guitar; and Britto plays "Miséria" and "Nem Cinco Minutos [Guardados]" (the latter on the piano, despite the song having been written on the acoustic guitar). During the shows, the members tell the story behind each song. This format was inspired by Springsteen on Broadway.

In 2018, vocalist and bassist Branco Mello took some time off the band to treat a tumor; according to him, the project marked his return to the band and, therefore, it is seen by him as an important moment in his career. The project's songs were rehearsed by the three current members in his living room; vocalist, keyboardist and bassist Sérgio Britto said the arrangements were created as if the band were preparing a small show for people paying them a visit at home.

Studio recording 
As early as June 2019, Mello already mentioned the possibility of releasing the project on DVD or on a studio album. In 2020, the band announced the project would be recorded in studio and the resulting work would be released in three EPs with a total of 25 tracks. The first one was expected for March. The COVID-19 pandemic didn't change their plans, even if promotional shows would be impossible.

A new version of "Sonífera Ilha" was released as a single and video on 20 March, when it was announced that the three EPs would be released from April on via BMG, the label to which they returned in late 2019.<ref name="oglobosi">{{Cite web|last=Essinger|first=Silvio|date=25 March 2020|title=Tony Bellotto: 'Estão vendo um novo sentido para a letra de 'Sonífera ilha|url=https://oglobo.globo.com/cultura/tony-bellotto-estao-vendo-um-novo-sentido-para-letra-de-sonifera-ilha-1-24326619|access-date=24 October 2020|website=O Globo|publisher=Grupo Globo|language = Portuguese}}</ref> The first EP (EP 01) was released on 3 April.

The second EP, EP 02, was released on 3 July and had a new version of "Enquanto Houver Sol" as single, released on 11 June. The third and last effort, EP 03, was released on 25 September and had a version of "Pra Dizer Adeus" as single. It received a video, released on 28 August.

On January 29, 2021, the album received its full version, with the 24 songs from the three EPs.

 Arrangements 
On the first EP, "Sonífera Ilha" kept its ska characteristics. "Porque Eu Sei que É Amor" became a Motown/R&B/soul ballad reminiscent of The Temptations. The version of "Querem Meu Sangue" is sung both in Portuguese and English, with the verses of the original song ("The Harder They Come", by Jimmy Cliff). "Miséria" was transcribed to the piano, contrasting with the electronic arrangement of its original version. "Família" is the only track on the first EP featuring Fabre and Lee.

 Track list 

 Critical reception 

Writing for O Povo, Marcos Sampaio (having heard only the first EP by the time of his review) said the project "made it obvious that the band suffers the wearing, the weight and the force of its own history" and said "after so many losses and reinventions, it was hard to find a safe and promising path for the band. The songs hold the weight of the history [...] Nothing is bad, everything has quality. But we need to understand that Titãs are not the same anymore and this third acoustic project will be compared with the first one, which is cowardice". He also believes there was "a concern with showing how alive Titãs are and how they worried about rebuilding the songs so that they would sound rejuvenated. And maybe that's the biggest problem of this new project. The need to prove things, as if it was still necessary to prove anything to anyone."

In his blog on G1, journalist Mauro Ferreira said the "songs originally featured in punk-looking albums – such as 'Cabeça dinossauro' (...) and 'Comida' – sound artificial, just like the foul message of '32 dentes'. As technically competent as the songs' performances are, the trio Titãs already looks like a mere cover of the band that made history in the pop universe of Brazil in the 1980s and 1990s. [...] Everything's once had more lushness, more truth, more real emotion. Not even the inclusion of a recent song – 'É você' [...] diluted the feeling that Titãs produce as an acoustic trio the nostalgia of modernity."

 Personnel 
Credits adapted from the song descriptions of the official tracks at YouTube.
 Some sources state Bellotto also played the semi-acoustic guitar without specifying the tracks.

 Titãs 
 EP 01 and EP 03 
 Tony Bellotto
 Lead vocals
 Backing vocals on "Família"
 Acoustic guitar on "Isso", "O Pulso", "Tô Cansado", "Família", "Comida" and "32 Dentes" and "Flores"
 Electric guitar on "Porque Eu Sei que É Amor", "O Pulso", "Querem Meu Sangue", "É Você", "Epitáfio" and "É Preciso Saber Viver"
Production on all tracks from EP 01 exceto "Isso"
 Branco Mello
 Lead vocals
 Backing vocals on "Família", "Comida" and "É Preciso Saber Viver"
 Bass on all tracks except "O Pulso", "Querem Meu Sangue" and "32 Dentes"
 Acoustic bass on "32 Dentes"
 Acoustic guitar on "Tô Cansado" and "Cabeça Dinossauro"
 Production on all tracks from EP 01 exceto "Isso"
 Sérgio Britto
 Lead vocals
 Backing vocals on "Isso", "Querem Meu Sangue" and all tracks from EP 03 Piano on all tracks except "O Pulso" and "32 Dentes", in which he plays the bass
 Production on all tracks from EP 01 exceto "Isso"

 EP 02 
Credits for Titãs on the songs from the second EP are presented generically as follows:
 Tony Bellotto — lead vocals, backing vocals, acoustic guitar, twelve-string acoustic guitar, lead, rhythm and slide guitar, production
 Branco Mello — lead vocals, backing vocals, acoustic guitar and production
 Sérgio Britto — lead vocals, backing vocals, keyboards, mellotron, organ, piano, synthesizer, acoustic guitar and production

 Supporting members and guest appearances 
 Beto Lee — acoustic guitar on "Família", "Televisão", "Homem Primata", "Bichos Escrotos" and all tracks from EP 03 except "É Preciso Saber Viver"
 Mario Fabre — drums on "Família", "Televisão", "Homem Primata", "Bichos Escrotos" and all tracks from EP 03 except "Cabeça Dinossauro"
 César Bottinha — finger snapping on "Sonífera Ilha"
 Sergio Fouad — production, finger snapping on "Sonífera Ilha"
 Emílio Martins — percussion on "O Pulso", "Miséria", "Go Back", "Polícia"
 Yaniel Matos — cello on "Toda Cor", "Nem 5 Minutos Guardados" and all tracks from EP 03 (officially credited for the third EP, though one cannot actually hear any cellos on those songs)
 Eder Araújo — flute and clarinet on "Nem 5 Minutos Guardados"; baritone saxophone on "Polícia"

 Technical personnel 
 Sergio Fouad — production, sound engineering
 Caio Laranjeira, César Bottinha, Douglas Martins, Mauricio Gargel, Ricardo Camera — sound engineering
 Ricardo Bocci — sound engineering on EP 03 César Bottinha — guitar technician on EP 02 and EP 03 Luis Augusto — assistant on EP 03''

Notes

References 

Portuguese-language albums
2021 albums
Titãs albums